In mathematics, specifically set theory, the Cartesian product of two sets A and B, denoted A×B, is the set of all ordered pairs  where a is in A and b is in B. In terms of set-builder notation, that is
 

A table can be created by taking the Cartesian product of a set of rows and a set of columns. If the Cartesian product  is taken, the cells of the table contain ordered pairs of the form .

One can similarly define the Cartesian product of n sets, also known as an n-fold Cartesian product, which can be represented by an n-dimensional array, where each element is an n-tuple. An ordered pair is a 2-tuple or couple. More generally still, one can define the Cartesian product of an indexed family of sets.

The Cartesian product is named after René Descartes, whose formulation of analytic geometry gave rise to the concept, which is further generalized in terms of direct product.

Examples

A deck of cards 

An illustrative example is the standard 52-card deck. The standard playing card ranks {A, K, Q, J, 10, 9, 8, 7, 6, 5, 4, 3, 2} form a 13-element set. The card suits  form a four-element set. The Cartesian product of these sets returns a 52-element set consisting of 52 ordered pairs, which correspond to all 52 possible playing cards. 

 returns a set of the form {(A, ♠), (A, ), (A, ), (A, ♣), (K, ♠), …, (3, ♣), (2, ♠), (2, ), (2, ), (2, ♣)}.

 returns a set of the form {(♠, A), (♠, K), (♠, Q), (♠, J), (♠, 10), …, (♣, 6), (♣, 5), (♣, 4), (♣, 3), (♣, 2)}.

These two sets are distinct, even disjoint, but there is a natural bijection between them, under which (3, ♣) corresponds to (♣, 3) and so on.

A two-dimensional coordinate system 

The main historical example is the Cartesian plane in analytic geometry. In order to represent geometrical shapes in a numerical way, and extract numerical information from shapes' numerical representations, René Descartes assigned to each point in the plane a pair of real numbers, called its coordinates. Usually, such a pair's first and second components are called its x and y coordinates, respectively (see picture). The set of all such pairs (i.e., the Cartesian product , with ℝ denoting the real numbers) is thus assigned to the set of all points in the plane.

Most common implementation (set theory) 

A formal definition of the Cartesian product from set-theoretical principles follows from a definition of ordered pair. Therefore, the existence of the Cartesian product of any two sets in ZFC follows from the axioms of pairing, union, power set, and specification. Since functions are usually defined as a special case of relations, and relations are usually defined as subsets of the Cartesian product, the definition of the two-set Cartesian product is necessarily prior to most other definitions.

Non-commutativity and non-associativity 
Let A, B, C, and D be sets.

The Cartesian product  is not commutative,
 
because the ordered pairs are reversed unless at least one of the following conditions is satisfied:
 A is equal to B, or
 A or B is the empty set.

For example:
 A = {1,2}; B = {3,4}
 A × B = {1,2} × {3,4} = {(1,3), (1,4), (2,3), (2,4)}
 B × A = {3,4} × {1,2} = {(3,1), (3,2), (4,1), (4,2)}

 A = B = {1,2}
 A × B = B × A = {1,2} × {1,2} = {(1,1), (1,2), (2,1), (2,2)}

 A = {1,2}; B = ∅
 A × B = {1,2} × ∅ = ∅
 B × A = ∅ × {1,2} = ∅

Strictly speaking, the Cartesian product is not associative (unless one of the involved sets is empty).
 
If for example A = {1}, then  .

Intersections, unions, and subsets 

The Cartesian product satisfies the following property with respect to intersections (see middle picture).

In most cases, the above statement is not true if we replace intersection with union (see rightmost picture).

In fact, we have that:

For the set difference, we also have the following identity:

Here are some rules demonstrating distributivity with other operators (see leftmost picture):

where  denotes the absolute complement of A.

Other properties related with subsets are:

Cardinality 

The cardinality of a set is the number of elements of the set. For example, defining two sets:  and  Both set A and set B consist of two elements each.
 A × B = {(a,5), (a,6), (b,5), (b,6)}.

where each element of A is paired with each element of B, and where each pair makes up one element of the output set.
The number of values in each element of the resulting set is equal to the number of sets whose Cartesian product is being taken; 2 in this case.
The cardinality of the output set is equal to the product of the cardinalities of all the input sets. That is,
 |A × B| = |A| · |B|.
In this case, |A × B| = 4

Similarly
 |A × B × C| = |A| · |B| · |C|
and so on.

The set  is infinite if either A or B is infinite, and the other set is not the empty set.

Cartesian products of several sets

n-ary Cartesian product 
The Cartesian product can be generalized to the n-ary Cartesian product over n sets X1, ..., Xn as the set

 

of n-tuples. If a tuple is defined as a function on  that takes its value at i to be the ith element of the tuple, then the Cartesian product X1×⋯×Xn is the set of functions

n-ary Cartesian power 
The Cartesian square of a set X is the Cartesian product .
An example is the 2-dimensional plane  where R is the set of real numbers: R2 is the set of all points  where x and y are real numbers (see the Cartesian coordinate system).

The  n-ary Cartesian power of a set X, denoted , can be defined as

 

The n-ary Cartesian power of a set X is isomorphic to the space of functions from an n-element set to X.  As a special case, the 0-ary Cartesian power of X may be taken to be a singleton set, corresponding to the empty function with codomain X.

Infinite Cartesian products 
It is possible to define the Cartesian product of an arbitrary (possibly infinite) indexed family of sets.

  

that is, the set of all functions defined on the index set such that the value of the function at a particular index i is an element of Xi.  Even if each of the Xi is nonempty, the Cartesian product may be empty if the axiom of choice, which is equivalent to the statement that every such product is nonempty, is not assumed.

For each j in I, the function 
 

Cartesian power is a Cartesian product where all the factors Xi are the same set X. In this case, 
  
is the set of all functions from I to X, and is frequently denoted XI. This case is important in the study of cardinal exponentiation. For example, each element of 
 
can be visualized as a vector with countably infinite real number components.

Other forms

Abbreviated form 
If several sets are being multiplied together (e.g., X1, X2, X3, …), then some authors choose to abbreviate the Cartesian product as simply ×Xi.

Cartesian product of functions 
 

This can be extended to tuples and infinite collections of functions.
This is different from the standard Cartesian product of functions considered as sets.

Cylinder 

Normally,  is considered to be the universe of the context and is left away.

Definitions outside set theory

Category theory
Although the Cartesian product is traditionally applied to sets, category theory provides a more general interpretation of the product of mathematical structures. This is distinct from, although related to, the notion of a Cartesian square in category theory, which is a generalization of the fiber product.

Exponentiation is the right adjoint of the Cartesian product; thus any category with a Cartesian product (and a final object) is a Cartesian closed category.

Graph theory
Instead, the categorical product is known as the tensor product of graphs.

See also
 Binary relation
 Concatenation of sets of strings
 Coproduct
 Cross product
 Direct product of groups
 Empty product
 Euclidean space
 Exponential object
 Finitary relation
 Join (SQL) § Cross join
 Orders on the Cartesian product of totally ordered sets
 Axiom of power set (to prove the existence of the Cartesian product)
 Product (category theory)
 Product topology
 Product type
 Ultraproduct

References

External links
 Cartesian Product at ProvenMath
 
 How to find the Cartesian Product, Education Portal Academy

Axiom of choice
Operations on sets